"Deeper Shade of Blue" is a song by British dance-pop group Steps, released as the fourth single from their second studio album, Steptacular (1999), on 3 April 2000. The song was originally recorded by English singer-songwriter Tina Cousins, but aside from a few promotional 12-inch vinyl discs pressed in 1998, her version remains unreleased. "Deeper Shade of Blue" entered the UK Singles Chart at number four and spent one more week in the top 10 before falling down the charts. After a total of nine weeks, it left the top 100.

In October 2011, following the band's reformation, Steps performed the track on Lorraine and Loose Women. The song was included on Steps's compilation albums Gold: Greatest Hits (2001), The Last Dance (2002), and The Ultimate Collection (2011). On 1 September 2015, Claire Richards Richards premiered a stripped-backed piano recording of the track via her social media pages.

Composition
The first two verses of the song are performed by Ian "H" Watkins and Claire Richards, respectively, whilst all five members perform the middle eight. The chorus also features all five voices.

Reception
Jon O'Brien wrote for AllMusic and in two different reviews he noted "Deeper Shade of Blue" is a "club potential", and the Sleaze Sisters remix is "realized on a Sash-esque trance remix". O'Brien also commented it is "Italo house-inspired" and it "fits right in with the current retro-dance revival". Lucas Villa from AXS described the song as a "futuristic club banger", adding that the group "battled the love blues atop pulsating house music beats with Richards' out-of-this-world vocals channeling the dance floor divas that came before her." He also stated that the song "remains the band's fiercest, most flawless effort." Can't Stop the Pop called it "a total mood-piece", noting that "the thumping club beat creates a brooding darkness that was quite unlike anything Steps had attempted before."

The song was referenced by Dave Benson Phillips during an episode of Get Your Own Back when H was thrown in the Gunk Dunk. After H's shocked reaction to being gunked, Benson Phillips remarked "As we can see, H has gone a deeper shade of blue" before H splashed him.

Music video
The music video has a futuristic style, with the group wearing blue and red latex uniforms with red latex gloves with the girls wearing blue latex hats for the dance sequences and each transforming into a darker alter ego during the video. The alter egos are to show the darker side of life that the song talks about.

Track listings

UK CD single
 "Deeper Shade of Blue" (radio edit) – 3:45
 "Deeper Shade of Blue" (W.I.P. mix) – 6:47
 "Deeper Shade of Blue" (Sleaze Sisters Anthem mix) – 7:54
 "Deeper Shade of Blue" (video) – 3:50

UK cassette single
 "Deeper Shade of Blue" (radio edit) – 3:45
 "Deeper Shade of Blue" (W.I.P. mix) – 6:47

European CD single
 "Deeper Shade of Blue" (Kiss W.I.P. remix) – 3:59
 "Deeper Shade of Blue" (radio edit) – 3:45

European maxi-CD single
 "Deeper Shade of Blue" (Kiss W.I.P. remix) – 3:59
 "Deeper Shade of Blue" (radio edit) – 3:45
 "Deeper Shade of Blue" (W.I.P. mix) – 6:47
 "Deeper Shade of Blue" (Sleaze Sisters Anthem mix) – 7:54
 "Deeper Shade of Blue" (Blockbuster Dirt Blue Klub mix) – 6:49

Credits and personnel
Credits are adapted from the liner notes of Steptacular.

Recording
 Recorded at PWL Studios, Manchester, in 1999
 Mixed at PWL Studios, Manchester
 Mastered at Transfermation Studios, London

Vocals
 Lead vocals – Ian "H" Watkins, Claire Richards
 Background vocals – Lisa Scott-Lee, Faye Tozer, Lee Latchford-Evans

Personnel

 Songwriting – Mark Topham, Karl Twigg
 Production – Mark Topham, Karl Twigg, Pete Waterman
 Mixing – Tim Speight
 Engineer – Chris McDonnell, Tim Speight

 Drums – Chris McDonnell
 Keyboards – Karl Twigg
 Guitar – Mark Topham
 Bass – Mark Topham

Charts

Weekly charts

Year-end charts

Certifications

References

1999 songs
2000 singles
Jive Records singles
Pete Waterman Entertainment singles
Songs written by Karl Twigg
Songs written by Mark Topham
Steps (group) songs